Jace Everett Beasley (born May 27, 1972) is an American singer-songwriter and musician. Signed to Epic Records in 2005, he released his debut single "That's the Kind of Love I'm In" in 2005, which peaked at No. 52 on the Billboard Hot Country Songs charts, and was the first single from his self-titled debut album. He also co-wrote Josh Turner's Number One single "Your Man".  His song "Bad Things" is the theme for the HBO series True Blood and peaked No. 2 in Norway in 2009. In the same year, he released his third album, Red Revelations, under the Weston Boys label that peaked No. 12 in Norway.

Biography 
Jace Everett was born in Evansville, Indiana in 1972. His father's jobs kept them on the move through Indianapolis and then St. Louis, MO before moving to Fort Worth, TX at the age of six. He started playing music in his church and in school concerts. He later moved to Nashville, TN to attend Belmont University.

In 2005, Everett was signed to Epic Records. He released his first single, "That's The Kind of Love I'm In", in June 2005. This song charted at No. 52 on the country charts, and was followed in early 2006 by the release of his self-titled debut album. Also in 2006, Josh Turner charted at Number One on the country charts with the song "Your Man", which Everett co-wrote, and for which Everett received a Broadcast Music Incorporated award. The album's other singles — "Bad Things," "Nowhere in the Neighborhood" and "Everything I Want" — did not chart in the United States, although "Bad Things" reached No. 2 in Norway, No. 30 in Sweden and No. 49 in UK in 2009.

"Bad Things" is used as the theme song for the HBO TV series True Blood. Charlaine Harris pays homage to the song by including "Bad Things" playing at Merlotte's in the 2010 Sookie Stackhouse mystery Dead in the Family. It won a 2009 Broadcast Music Incorporated award in the cable television category and was nominated for a 2009 Scream Award for "Best Scream Song of the Year." His album, entitled Red Revelations, was released in June 2009. His duet Evil (Is Going On), a cover of the song written by Willie Dixon, with CC Adcock is part of the True Blood season 2 soundtrack. A new album, "Mr. Good Times" was released in 2011. His latest album, "Terra Rosa" was released digitally on July 23, 2013.

Discography

Albums

Singles

Music videos

References

External links
Official website

1972 births
Living people
American country rock singers
Musicians from Evansville, Indiana
Epic Records artists
Belmont University alumni
21st-century American singers
Singer-songwriters from Indiana